Obiang may refer to:
The Singlish word for "old-fashioned".
Adolfo Obiang Biko (born 1940), author, politician and president of MONALIGE
Gaston Engohang Obiang, a Gabonese politician
Jean César Essone Obiang, a Gabonese politician
Pedro Obiang, (born 1992), Equatoguinean–Spanish footballer
Teodoro Nguema Obiang (born 1971), son of Teodoro Obiang Nguema Mbasogo, the president of Equatorial Guinea
Teodoro Obiang Nguema Mbasogo (born 1942), the President of Equatorial Guinea, having served since 1979
Esteban Obiang (born 1998), Equatoguinean-Spanish footballer